The Weaver–Fox House is a historic home located at Uniontown, Carroll County, Maryland, United States. It is a simplified Victorian Italianate villa, two stories high with a hip roof. It features two chimneys flanking a rectangular, hipped roof cupola. The house was built during the years 1874 and 1875 as the home of Dr. Jacob J. Weaver, Jr., a country physician.

The Weaver–Fox House was listed on the National Register of Historic Places in 1975.

References

External links
, including photo from 2006, at Maryland Historical Trust

Houses on the National Register of Historic Places in Maryland
Houses in Carroll County, Maryland
Houses completed in 1874
Italianate architecture in Maryland
Uniontown, Maryland
National Register of Historic Places in Carroll County, Maryland